Gold is Where You Find It is a 1938 American Western Technicolor film that gives a fictionalized account of a true event — an ecological disaster whose effects are still felt in California today. Directed by Michael Curtiz and starring George Brent, Olivia de Havilland, and Claude Rains, with a screenplay by Warren Duff and Robert Buckner based on a story by Clements Ripley, the film is set 30 years after the first California Gold Rush, when hydraulic mining sends floods of muddy sludge into the Sacramento Valley, destroying crops and homes, ruining land and water sources and killing people caught in their path. The film highlights the conflict between the mining companies and the wheat farmers by adding a romance between a mining engineer (George Brent) and the daughter (Olivia de Havilland) of a prominent farmer (Claude Rains). She is herself dedicated to the idea that fruit can be raised in the valley. This Technicolor feature film was released on February 12, 1938, by Warner Bros. Pictures.

Plot summary
A new gold strike in California ten years after the American Civil War triggers a bitter feud between farmers and miners using hydraulic mining methods that devastate the wheat farms of the Sacramento Valley.

The film ends with Jared and Serena looking out over the valley while Jared speaks eloquently of the possible future. A  vivid montage shows all the different trees bearing fruit there in the 1930s, ending with the orange groves.  Serena's vision, once dismissed as impossible, has been realized.

Cast
 George Brent as Jared Whitney  
 Olivia de Havilland as Serena Ferris  
 Claude Rains as Col. Chris Ferris  
 Margaret Lindsay as Rosanne McCooey Ferris 
 John Litel as Ralph Ferris  
 Marcia Ralston as Molly Featherstone  
 Barton MacLane as Slag Minton (Credits list the character as Slag Martin)
 Tim Holt as Lance Ferris  
 Sidney Toler as Harrison McCooey  
 Henry O'Neill as Supreme Court Judge 
 Douglas Wood as District Court Judge Clayburn
 Willie Best as Joshua  
 Robert McWade as Mr. Crouch  
 George 'Gabby' Hayes as Enoch (as George Hayes)  
 Russell Simpson as MacKenzie  
 Harry Davenport as Dr. Parsons
 Clarence Kolb as Major Walsh
 Moroni Olsen as Sen. George Hearst
 Walter Rodgers as Gen. Ulysses S. Grant

Notes
While stationed in South Carolina in 1919, Clements Ripley met and married Katherine (Kattie) Ball, the daughter of noted journalist W. W. Ball. They lived in North Carolina and grew peaches until 1927, when they moved to Charleston, South Carolina to become writers.

The real landmark lawsuit was Woodruff v. North Bloomfield Gravel Mining Company, brought in 1882 and settled in 1884.

This was the second Warner Bros. movie to be shot in the new three-strip Technicolor process.

According to TCM's Brian Cady, "director Michael Curtiz's felicity with the Technicolor camera led Warner Brothers to put him in the director's chair in place of William Keighley for their next Technicolor extravaganza, The Adventures of Robin Hood (1938). "

The film was shot near Weaverville, California and was plagued by torrential rains.

References

External links
 
 
 
 

1938 films
1938 Western (genre) films
1938 romantic drama films
1930s color films
American Western (genre) films
American romantic drama films
1930s English-language films
Films directed by Michael Curtiz
Films produced by Hal B. Wallis
Films produced by Samuel Bischoff
Films scored by Max Steiner
Films about mining
Warner Bros. films
1930s American films